Bernadette Perrine-Ravina (born 18 February 1975) is a retired Mauritian javelin thrower.

She won the bronze medal at the 1995 All-Africa Games, the silver medal at the 1997 Jeux de la Francophonie, the silver medal at the 1998 African Championships, finished sixth at the 2001 Jeux de la Francophonie, won the bronze medal at the 2002 African Championships, finished eighth at the 2002 Commonwealth Games, sixth at the 2006 African Championships, seventh at the 2010 African Championships, fourth at the 2011 All-Africa Games and seventh at the 2012 African Championships.

She also won the 1998 and 2003 Indian Ocean Island Games. As a shot putter she finished fifth at the 1998 African Championships.

Her personal best throw is 54.56 metres, achieved in June 2002 in Réduit. This is the Mauritian record.

References

1975 births
Living people
Mauritian female javelin throwers
Commonwealth Games competitors for Mauritius
Athletes (track and field) at the 2002 Commonwealth Games
Athletes (track and field) at the 1995 All-Africa Games
Athletes (track and field) at the 2011 All-Africa Games
African Games medalists in athletics (track and field)
African Games bronze medalists for Mauritius
20th-century Mauritian people